Gould Estate v Stoddart Publishing Co Ltd (1998), 39 OR 555 (Ont CA), is a Canadian case on appropriation of personality, the ownership of copyright, and requirements of fixation.

Background

During 1956, Jock Carroll interviewed a young Glenn Gould for an article in Weekend Magazine. Carroll documented much of the encounter, he took pictures of Gould, wrote notes and took an audio recording of the interview. All of this was permitted by Gould. The article was eventually published under the title "I Don't Think I'm at All Eccentric".
Gould died in 1982.  In 1995, Stoddart Publishing published Carroll's book, Glenn Gould: Some Portraits of the Artist as a Young Man. The book contained 70 photographs from the 1956 interview, as well a narrative that was largely based on the 1956 notes and recording, including many quotations by Gould.

The estate of Glenn Gould brought an action against Carroll and Stoddart Publishing for copyright infringement in the material that Carroll had recorded and the pictures he had taken, as well as for appropriation of personality. Both sides agreed that there was no contract in effect that would have governed the matter.

The judgment below

At trial, Lederman J.  dismissed both claims.

On the copyright issue, copyright in the photographs vested in the defendants, while Gould’s oral statements in the interview did not attract copyright which might have given the estate standing to sue.
On the issue of appropriation of personality, the judge found that Gould's proprietary rights were not violated because Gould's image was used as a subject of the book rather than for endorsement.

Lederman J. discussed the area of appropriation of personality at some length in his judgment. In obiter comments, he characterized it as being a right of publicity, as opposed to a right of privacy. The latter is a personal right which does not survive the death of the subject, while the former can devolve to the subject's estate:

He summarized the issue of copyright as follows:

At the Court of Appeal

The Court of Appeal for Ontario affirmed the trial decision, dismissing the appeal but decided the case on conventional copyright principles rather than appropriation of personality. The court held that the oral statements of Gould could not be protected by copyright because there was not fixation. Gould was not reading from a speech or had prepared anything that was said.

Finlayson J.A. approved the trial judge's findings, where he held:

See also
 Krouse v Chrysler Canada Ltd

References

External links
 

Canadian copyright case law
Glenn Gould
1998 in Canadian case law
Court of Appeal for Ontario cases
1998 in Ontario